Khaya Dladla (born 3 April 1990), is a South African actor, model and musician. He is best known for the role "GC" in the television soapie Uzalo. and now currently playing a role of Lazarus on House Of Zwide

Personal life
Dladla was born on 3 April 1990 in Umlazi, South Africa as the fifth child in a family with six siblings. His father is Reggie Dladla, and mother is Thandi Dladla. He completed primary education from Isipingo Hills Primary School. In 2005, he matriculated from Brettonwood High School. He completed a Diploma in Advertising from the Varsity College. Then he graduated with his Bachelor of Arts degree in Marketing and Communications from the University of South Africa (UNISA).

He is married to his longtime boyfriend, Mercutio Buthelezi.

Career
In 2013, he acted in the SABC 1soap opera Uzalo by playing the role "G.C.". The show became very popular and he won the Best Supporting Actor award at the Simon Sabela Awards for his role. In 2016, he participated as a model at the Durban Fashion Fair. After that show, he appeared with the role of "Nxebale Ndoda" in the Mzansi television serial eHostela. In 2021, he joined with the television serial House of Zwide and played the role "Lazarus". Later in mid 2021, he joined again with the soapie Uzalo.

He is also a musician and worked in the music group Salt & Light. He worked as a background vocalist for the musicians such as Hugh Masekela, Salif Keita and Thandiswa Mazwai. Recently he has featured in YoungStar’s “INGOMA” and “Indovozi”. Recently he started a radio gig at a KZN radio station, Gagasi FM.

Filmography

References

External links
 IMDb

Living people
Zulu people
South African male film actors
South African male television actors
1990 births
South African gay actors
South African gay musicians